The 2021 Solihull Metropolitan Borough Council election  took place on 6 May 2021 to elect members of Solihull Metropolitan Borough Council in England. This was on the same day as other local elections. One-third of the seats were up for election.

Results

Ward results

Bickenhill

Blythe

Castle Bromwich

Chelmsley Wood

Dorridge and Hockley Heath

Elmdon

Kingshurst and Fordbridge

Knowle

Lyndon

Meriden

Olton

Shirley East

Shirley South

Shirley West

Silhill

Smith's Wood

St Alphege

References 

Solihull
Solihull Council elections